UWA may stand for:

Uganda Wildlife Authority
Universal Wrestling Association, a Mexican Lucha Libre promotion
University of West Alabama
University of Western Australia
Uwa, Ehime in Japan
U'wa people, a small indigenous tribe in Colombia
Uwa, Nepal
Ultra wide angle lens
Ware Airport, IATA code UWA

See also

 Aberystwyth University, previously University of Wales, Aberystwyth